Xanthoparmelia kalbii is a species of foliose lichen in the family Parmeliaceae. Found in Brazil, it was described as a species new to science in 1984 by American lichenologist Mason E. Hale. The type was collected in Catimbau National Park in Pernambuco. The specific epithet honours Klaus Kalb, "the first professional lichenologist to collect extensively in Brazil since G. A. Malme in the 1890s".

It contains usnic, hypostictic, and hyposalazinic acids as secondary chemicals.

See also
List of Xanthoparmelia species

References

kalbii
Lichen species
Lichens of Northeast Brazil
Lichens described in 1984
Taxa named by Mason Hale